Platygillellus bussingi, Bussing's stargazer, is a species of sand stargazer native to the Pacific coast of Costa Rica and Panama where it can be found on sandy bottoms at depths of from .  It can reach a maximum length of  TL. Its specific name honours the ichthyologist and collector of the type William Bussing (1933-2014) of the Universidad de Costa Rica.

References

External links
 Photograph

bussingi
Fish described in 1974
Taxa named by Charles Eric Dawson